RACSAM (Revista de la Real Academia de Ciencias Exactas, Físicas y Naturales,  Serie A Matemáticas, Journal of the Spanish Royal Academy of Sciences, Series A Mathematics)  is the mathematical journal of the Spanish Royal Academy of Sciences published by Springer since 2011, with a periodicity of four issues per year. It publishes original research papers in English, covering the areas of Algebra, Applied Mathematics, Computational Sciences, Geometry and Topology, Mathematical Analysis, Statistics and Operations Research.

History 
RACSAM was founded in 2001 by the Mathematical Sciences Section of the Spanish Royal Academy of Sciences. Its first editor-in-chief was Prof. Jesús Ildefonso Díaz (2001-2005).  It is a spin-off of the journal Revista de la Real Academia de Ciencias Exactas, Físicas y Naturales, founded in 1905, a generic journal covering physics, chemistry and the natural sciences as well as mathematics. This justify that both journals have the same numeration of its volumes. It was initially published by the Royal Academy until 2010. In 2005, Prof. Manuel Lopez-Pellicer became the editor-in-chief of the journal, which from 2011 began to be published by Springer. It entered into the Journal Citation Reports in 2011. It was ranked 56th out of 309 journals in the Mathematical Sciences Section of the 2017 Journal Citation Reports. Contributors include H. Amann, S. Antontsev, R. Aron, J. Berger, K. D. Bierstedt, H. Brezis, G. Casella, G. Godefroy, M. de Guzmán, A. Defant, J. Diestel, Seán Dineen,  P. Domanski, M. Fabian, S. French, P. Hájek, V. Kadets, M. Kaufmann, V. V. Tkachuk, V. Lomonosov, M. Mastylo, R. Meise, I. Namioka, A. M. Plichko, J. Porti, W. J. Ricker, T.L. Saaty, E. Sánchez-Palencia, S.A. Saxon, T. Schlumprecht, J. Schmets, S. Shmarev, G. I. Sivashinsky, H. M. Srivastava, S. Todorcevic, S. Troyanski, M. Valdivia, J. van Mill, D. Vogt, C. Weber, E. Zelmanov and V. Zizler.
The journal was awarded the FECYT High Quality label in 2014.
The RACSAM papers in the years 2001-2010 appear in open access at the site .  As from 2008, they appear at the Springer journal site .

Editors 
Editors-in-Chief: , David Ríos Insua, L. Vega.

Senior Editors: J. Bonet, P.L. García, J.M. Sanz-Serna.
 
Editorial Board: Pilar Bayer, F. Bombal, E. Castillo, Jesús Ildefonso Díaz, F. J. Girón, J. Jiménez, A. Liñán, Juan Luis Vázquez Suárez.

Scientific Committee: H. Amann, J. M. Aroca Hernández-Ros, R. M. Aron, Sir M. Atiyah, A. Balbás, Jim Berger (statistician), A. Bermúdez de Castro, J. M. Bernardo, J. P. Bourguignon, H. Brezis, L. A. Caffarelli, A. F. Costa, P. Deheuvels, S. Dineen, J. Duato, F. Etayo Gordejuela, J. L. Fernández, S. French, A. Friedman, M. Gasca, F. L. Hernández, M. A. Herrero, H. Hironaka, J. Kąkol, M. A. López-Cerdá, M. T. Lozano, R. Lüst, M. Maestre, Y. Matsumoto, Y. Meyer, V. Montesinos Santalucía, E. Moreno, H. Moritz, G. Navarro, A. M. Naveira, D. Nualart, J. Orihuela, E. L. Ortiz, D. Peña, D. Pérez-García, F. Pérez Monasor, Á. Rodríguez Palacios, J. M. R. Sanjurjo, S. A. Saxon, J. Schmets, C. Simó, G. I. Sivashinsky, H. M. Srivastava, S. Sternberg, Terence Tao, S. L. Troyanski, L. Vázquez, E. I. Zelmanov, P. Zoroa Terol.

Evolution 
The following table presents the evolution of the number of citations of RACSAM

The following table presents the ranking evolution of RACSAM

Abstracting and indexing 
RACSAM is in Current Contents (Physical Chemical and Earth Sciences), ISI Web of Science, MathSciNet, Zentralblatt MATH, Scopus, and Google Scholar.

References 
 "Journal List – American Mathematical Society".
 MathSciNet  
 Zentralblatt 
 Jesus Ildefonso Díaz. The beginning of a new era for RACSAM,

External links 
 Official website
 European Digital Mathematics Library (EuDML) 
 Scientific information and documentation center, Digital Mathematics Library (DML-E) 

Mathematics journals